Mark Evan Halperin (born January 11, 1965) is an American journalist, today a host and commentator for Newsmax TV. Halperin previously had worked as the political director forABC News, where he also served as the editor of the Washington, D.C.,
newsletter The Note. In 2010, Halperin joined MSNBC, becoming the senior political analyst and a contributor. Along with John Heilemann, Halperin served as co-managing editor of Bloomberg Politics.
Halperin and Heilemann co-wrote Game Change and Double Down: Game Change 2012, were co-hosts of MSNBC and Bloomberg's With All Due Respect, and produced and co-starred with Mark McKinnon in Showtime's The Circus: Inside the Greatest Political Show on Earth, which followed the presidential candidates behind the scenes of their campaigns in the 2016 United States Presidential Election.

In response to more than a dozen allegations of workplace sexual harassment and sexual assault at his prior position at ABC News, Halperin was fired by both Showtime Networks and NBC News towards the end of October 2017.

Since 2020, Halperin has appeared on the ultraconservative, pro-Donald Trump Newsmax TV as a contributor and is the host of their weekly Sunday show, Mark Halperin's Focus Group.

Early life and education
Halperin was born to a Jewish family, the son of Morton Halperin, a foreign policy expert and staff member of the National Security Council during the presidential administration of Richard Nixon; and Ina Weinstein Halperin Young. He was born in New York City but raised in Bethesda, Maryland.

In 1982, before he began his senior year at Walt Whitman High School, he lived with a family in Japan as part of the Youth for Understanding program. He received his B.A. from Harvard University in 1987.

Career

In 1988, Halperin began his career as a desk assistant for ABC News and a researcher for World News Tonight. He then worked as a general assignment reporter in Washington.

In 1992, he worked full-time as an off-air producer covering the presidential campaign of Bill Clinton. In 1994, Halperin became a producer with ABC's special events unit in New York and later an editorial producer.

In 1997, he was named the political director for ABC News. In that capacity, Halperin appeared frequently as a correspondent and political analyst for ABC News television and radio programs. He founded and edited The Note, which appeared daily on ABCNews.com.

In October 2006, Halperin and John F. Harris, published a book together, The Way to Win: Clinton, Bush, Rove, and How to Take the White House in 2008.

Since 2006, Halperin has served as a board member of the New Hampshire Institute of Politics at Saint Anselm College in Goffstown, New Hampshire. He has been on their public advisory board since it was created in 2008.

In March 2007, Halperin became a political analyst for ABC News and was replaced as political director by David Chalian. In May 2007, Halperin was hired as a political analyst and editor at large for Time magazine. In June 2010, he was hired as a senior political analyst at MSNBC. In 2011, Time released an iPad app called "Mark Halperin 2012" that contains material from Halperin's "The Page" as well as video, photos, breaking news, and Halperin's take on the news.

Halperin and co-author John Heilemann wrote the 2010 Game Change: Obama and the Clintons, McCain and Palin, and the Race of a Lifetime. Subsequently, the book was made into the HBO movie Game Change, which premiered on March 10, 2012. Halperin had a cameo role in the movie as a reporter. Halperin and Heilemann followed in 2012 with a book about that election titled Double Down: Game Change 2012.

Criticism
On June 30, 2011, Halperin was suspended from his duties at MSNBC for "slurring" President Barack Obama on the program Morning Joe, after commenting said of Obama "I thought he was kind of a dick" " for his performance at the previous day's press conference. His suspension was lifted a month later.

In December 2011, Halperin was listed as number 1 in Salons 2011 Hack List, his reporting described as "shallow and predictable" as well as "both fixated solely on the horse race and also uniquely bad at analyzing the horse race."

Alex Shephard, writing in The New Republic, criticized his coverage for being "totally fixated" on the horse race and for shallow analysis, and "that he’s wanted to carry Donald Trump's bags for years." 

Conversely, Benjamin Wallace-Wells of The New Yorker wrote that Halperin's The Circus is "both an argument for horse-race journalism and a way to see its inner workings, and so to track Heilemann and Halperin in their long traipse across the American interior is to see the media discovering its own vulnerabilities, just as Trump was exploiting them."

The Washington Posts Dana Milbank called Halperin's analysis in the 2016 United States presidential campaign "soulless" and "amoral", citing several instances where Halperin praised Republican nominee Donald Trump. Milbank noted that Halperin had declared on Morning Joe in March 2016 that Trump was "one of the two most talented presidential candidates any of us have covered." Earlier, in January 2020, also on “Morning Joe,” Halperin said Trump’s attacks on the Clintons were “politically brilliant.”  In June 2016, on his Bloomberg TV show, With All Due Respect, Milbank noted Halperin asserted that "it's not racial" for Trump to attempt to disqualify an Indiana-born federal judge as a "Mexican" because of his ancestry. His reason: "Mexico isn't a race." 

In November 2016, NBC's Brian Williams said Halperin had "gone out of his way" to give Trump favorable coverage. "When Donald Trump complains he is not getting favorable coverage in the MSM"—making reference to the mainstream media—"he has not been listening to you this cycle", Williams said to Halperin on Williams' show. "I think you've gone out of your way to find the path, argue for the path, forge the path for him in an argumentative way with your cohost to the nomination."

Sexual harassment allegations

On October 26, 2017, CNN reported that five women had accused Halperin of sexual harassment. One woman told the network she was assaulted after visiting Halperin in the early 2000s. "I went up to have a soda and talk and—he just kissed me and grabbed my boobs", the woman said. "I just froze. I didn't know what to do." 

Yet another woman told CNN that Halperin once pressed his penis on her shoulder during the 2004 campaign cycle. "I was obviously completely shocked", she said. "Given I was so young and new, I wasn't sure if that was the sort of thing that was expected of you if you wanted something from a male figure in news." 

And another former ABC News woman employee, told CNN that she had been on the road with Halperin when he propositioned her. "I excused myself to go to the bathroom and he was standing there when I opened the door, propositioning [me] to go into the other bathroom to do something", she said. "It freaked me out. I came out of the ladies' room and he was just standing there. Like almost blocking the door." 

CNN also reported that three other women described Halperin, "without consent, pressing an erection against their bodies while he was clothed."  One woman recalled an incident during which "Halperin had pressed his genitals against her while she was seated in his office."

Halperin apologized for pursuing "relationships with women that I worked with, including some junior to me", but denied allegations that he pressed his genitals against one woman and grabbed another woman's breast. He further announced that he would temporarily leave his daily work to "properly deal with this situation."

Later that day, NBC News released a statement saying that in light of the allegations, Halperin would not return as a senior political analyst "until the questions around his past conduct are fully understood." HBO announced it would no longer go forward with a planned miniseries about the presidential election that was based in part on Halperin's then-upcoming book on the 2016 election. The premium cable channel said in a statement, "HBO has no tolerance for sexual harassment within the company or its productions." Penguin Press also canceled the latest installment of the Game Change series Halperin was co-authoring with John Heilemann, which HBO had already canceled plans to adapt.

A day after their first story, CNN ran a second story revealing that the number of women accusing Halperin of misconduct had grown to "at least a dozen". In a lengthy statement published in response to the CNN report, Halperin denied several of the new allegations, including ones that he masturbated in front of anyone or physically assaulted anyone. He apologized to the women he "mistreated" while acknowledging that he recognized he had a problem near the end of his tenure at ABC, received weekly counseling sessions, and ended the behavior; however, a later report from The Daily Beast included an allegation of harassment from 2011.

On October 30, 2017, both NBC and MSNBC terminated Halperin's contract with the networks. On January 3, 2018, Showtime replaced Halperin on The Circus with CBS News anchor Alex Wagner.

Comeback attempts
According to a May 3, 2019 report in The Daily Beast, Halperin worked on repairing his reputation during the first quarter of 2019 with a goal of returning as a pundit on television and radio. According to the article, Halperin enlisted the help of Michael Smerconish, Mika Brzezinski, and Joe Scarborough on an under-the-radar yet calculated professional rehabilitation campaign. Since the beginning of 2019, Halperin resumed posting on Twitter and launched a new political blog titled "Mark Halperin’s Wide World of News" in mid-April. Around the same time, Halperin appeared on Sirius XM with Smerconish, where he said he has been working with the Fortune Society, a New York City-based nonprofit organization that provides essential support to the formerly incarcerated.

On August 18, 2019, publisher Regan Arts announced that Halperin had signed a new book deal. The book, entitled How to Beat Trump: America's Top Political Strategists on What It Will Take, was published in early-November 2019. Contributors to the book include David Axelrod, Donna Brazile, and James Carville. Both CNN and NBC declined to promote the book.

After news broke about the upcoming book, there was widespread criticism and outrage, with Gretchen Carlson calling the deal "a slap in the face to all women." Rebecca Katz, a political strategist said on Twitter, "you can beat Trump without supporting the career rehabilitation of Mark Halperin." CNN political commentator Karen Finney called Halperin "a predator" and denounced publisher Regan Arts. Eleanor McManus, who as a 21-year-old job seeker at ABC, who Halperin attempted to force himself upon, commented:  "He leveraged his position as a prominent journalist to prey on women... Giving him a book once again puts him in a position of authority and that is a slap in the face to all the women that he has victimized."

According to a September 9, 2019 report in The Daily Beast, Halperin allegedly exchanged vague threats on a call with MSNBC president Phil Griffin after Griffin refused to approve a possible collaboration with the Morning Joe team earlier in 2019.

In 2020, Halperin began appearing on Newsmax TV as a contributor and as the host of its weekly Sunday show, Mark Halperin's Focus Group.  Newsmax TV, a pro-Trump right wing news outlet, has trafficked in conspiracy theories and baseless claims asserting that Donald Trump was the real winner of the 2020 presidential election and that the Jan. 6 insurrection on the Capitol was incited by left wing provocateurs and the FBI.

Personal life 
Halperin resides in New York City with his girlfriend, Karen Avrich, co-author of Sasha and Emma.

Bibliography
 Mark Halperin and John F. Harris, The Way to Win: Taking the White House in 2008, Random House, October 2006, 
 Mark Halperin and John Heilemann, Game Change: Obama and the Clintons, McCain and Palin, and the Race of a Lifetime, Harper, January 2010, 
 Mark Halperin and John Heilemann, Double Down: Game Change 2012, Penguin Press, November 2013 
 Mark Halperin, How to Beat Trump: America's Top Political Strategists on What It Will Take,  Regan Arts, November 2019

References

External links

 The Page, Halperin's blog at Time.com
 Biography
 
 
 
 

1965 births
Living people
Harvard University alumni
People from Bethesda, Maryland
Jewish American journalists
ABC News personalities
MSNBC people
American radio reporters and correspondents
American television reporters and correspondents
American political journalists
American magazine editors
Writers from Maryland
American political writers
21st-century American non-fiction writers
American male journalists
Newsmax TV people
21st-century American male writers
Walt Whitman High School (Maryland) alumni